Eastland High School may refer to:

Eastland High School (Illinois)
Eastland High School (Texas)